Stéfanie Stantcheva (born in 1986 Bulgaria) is a Bulgarian-born French economist who is the Nathaniel Ropes Professor of Political Economy at Harvard University. She is a member of the French Council of Economic Analysis. Her research focuses on public finance—in particular questions of optimal taxation. In 2018, she was selected by The Economist as one of the 8 best young economists of the decade. In 2020, she was awarded the Elaine Bennett Research Prize. In 2021, she received the Prix Maurice Allais.

Career 
Born in 1986 in Bulgaria, Stefanie Stancheva lived in East Germany until the fall of the Berlin Wall in 1989 and spent most of her schooling and higher education in France. After completing her secondary education at the Lycée International de Saint-Germain-en-Laye, she obtained her Bachelor of Arts degree in economics from University of Cambridge in 2007, a MS in economics and finance from École Polytechnique in 2008, and a MS in economics from ENSAE, the École nationale de la statistique et de l'administration économique Paris, School for Advanced Studies in the Social Sciences (EHESS) and Paris School of Economics in 2009. She received her PhD in economics from the Massachusetts Institute of Technology (MIT) in 2014. Stantcheva's interest in economics had its roots in the economic turmoil of her homeland Bulgaria after it turned away from Communism in the 1990s.

Since 2014, Stantcheva has been employed at Harvard University. From 2014 to 2016 she was a Junior Fellow at Harvard Society of Fellows. She was an Assistant Professor 2016–17, an Associate Professor 2017–18 and was promoted to a full Professor in May 2018. She has founded and runs the Social Economics Lab at Harvard, that runs large-scale online surveys in many countries to understand how people think, how they form their perceptions, beliefs, and attitudes, and how their views on economic and social policies emerge.

Stantcheva is a 2018 Sloan Research Fellow, a 2017 Harvard University Furer Fellow, and an NSF CAREER Award Recipient. She was part of the 2014 Review of Economic Studies' Tour. She was selected as the best French young Economist in 2019 by the journal Le Monde and the Cercle des Économistes. She was awarded the Young Economist Award from the Fondation France-Israel in 2019.

Stantcheva currently teaches undergraduate and graduate Public Economics at Harvard University and has taught other Economics and Policy courses in the past.

Professional activities
Stantcheva is an associate editor of the Journal of Political Economy (from May 2017), of the Quarterly Journal of Economics (from August 2018), and of the American Economic Review (from August 2018). In 2016 and 2017, she received the Excellence in Refereeing Award from the American Economic Review. In 2018 she was appointed as a member of the French Council of Economic Analysis (Conseil d'Analyse Economique), a non-partisan advisory body to the French Prime Minister. In 2021 she was named a Fellow of the Econometric Society.

Social Economics Lab
Stantcheva is the founder of the Social Economics Lab at Harvard. This lab conducts surveys of several countries to understand how their people think, and their attitudes and actions towards new social and economic policy. This data is extremely important to understand "invisible" data, like behavior, attitude, and belief. Some notable surveys taken, involve perceived versus actual numbers of immigrants and unemployment amongst them, shortcomings of the US tax system, and social mobility across US states. The most recent research coming out of this lab is how people reason with US tax policy, which mainly revolves around fairness, distribution, and government efficiency of taxes. In addition, studies into how people from different countries react to policy changes that seem to impede on civil liberties during COVID 19, is another critical point of research.

Research
Stantcheva's research concerns public finance—in particular, the question of how tax and transfer systems can better simultaneously raise revenues, reduce inequality, and foster the productivity of firms and individuals. She focuses on three aspects of optimal taxation: 1) the dynamic effects of taxation, 2) the corrective role of taxation in the presence of asymmetric information and other market failures, and 3) social preferences and perceptions to understand the determinants of tax policy. She combines theory and empirical work.

In the Social Economics Lab at Harvard University that she founded, she has developed the use of large-scale, cross-country Social Economic Surveys and experiments to study how people form their views about policies and their social attitudes. She has more particularly focused on the perceptions of intergenerational mobility, immigration, and inequality and their link to support for redistribution. These Social Economics Surveys are rigorous research tools that can shed light on what is invisible in order datasets: perceptions, beliefs, reasoning, attitudes, views, and detailed individual economic circumstances.

Together with Emmanuel Saez and Thomas Piketty, she has presented a model of optimal labor income taxation for top incomes, taking into account standard labor supply responses as well as tax avoidance and compensation bargaining. In another project together with Emmanuel Saez she has characterized optimal taxation of capital income.

Stantcheva has studied the interplay between taxation and innovation, examining the effects of personal and corporate income taxation on innovation and thinking about how to better design the tax system and R&D policies to foster innovation. In "Taxation and Innovation in the 20th Century" she analyzes the impacts of individual and corporate income taxes on individual inventors, firms that do R&D, and on innovation at the state level in the U.S. throughout the 20th century. She has also shown that top personal tax rates affect the international location choices of superstar inventors.

Media
Stantcheva has made numerous appearances in the media both as an author and a speaker. Stantcheva has written articles for French newspapers of record Le Monde and Le Figaro and appeared in video essays by Vox. Recently Stantcheva spoke in a Vox video entitled "Where does Innovation come from?". Stantcheva has also given many lectures and talks, some of which are filmed.

Selected bibliography

Optimal Taxation of Top Labor Incomes: A Tale of Three Elasticities. (with T. Piketty & E. Saez). American Economic Journal: Economic Policy, Vol. 6, No. 1, pp. 230–271, February 2014.
How elastic are preferences for redistribution? Evidence from randomized survey experiments. (with I. Kuziemko, M. Norton, and E. Saez). American Economic Review. Vol. 105, No. 4, pp. 1478–1508, April 2015.
Generalized social marginal welfare weights for optimal tax theory. (with E. Saez). American Economic Review 2016, Vol. 106, No.1, pp. 24–45. January 2016.
Optimal Taxation and Human Capital Policies over the Life Cycle. Journal of Political Economy, Vol. 125, No. 6, pp-1931-1990, 2017.
Immigration and redistribution. (with A. Alesina & A. Miano) National Bureau of Economic Research, Working Paper 24733, June 2018.
Intergenerational mobility and preferences for redistribution. (with A. Alesina & E. Teso). American Economic Review. Vol. 108, No. 2, pp. 521–54, February 2018.

References

External links
 Stefanie Stantcheva's homepage

Living people
French women economists
French economists
21st-century French economists
MIT School of Humanities, Arts, and Social Sciences alumni
Harvard University faculty
Bulgarian emigrants to France
Alumni of the University of Cambridge
École Polytechnique alumni
Paris School of Economics alumni
Massachusetts Institute of Technology alumni
Fellows of the Econometric Society
Naturalized citizens of France
1986 births